Musa Ćazim Ćatić (12 March 1878 – 6 April 1915) was a Bosnian poet of the Bosnian-Herzegovinian Renaissance at the turn of the 20th century.

Life
Ćatić completed Sharia Law studies in Zagreb. He worked as the editor of Behar and Biser magazines and in the Muslim Library of Mostar. He is today featured on the 50 convertible mark banknote of Bosnia and Herzegovina.

Poetic style and influence

Esoteric
Ćatić was a poet by vocation and emotional structure who poetically experienced and imaginatively sublimated everything he came into contact with. Ćatić's poetry was life, the meaning of existence, the atmosphere of reality, and the medium in which his spirit ranged.

Mystic
The poetic theme of Ćatić is situated, mainly, between two poles: eroticism by instinct and mysticism by spiritual endeavor, respectively. The combination of these motives sometimes occurred with a certain sense of spiritual distress, while sometimes sublimated in the form of sin, life and repentance as visioned by Epicurus and Khayyám. Mysticism though never separates Ćatić from reality and life; his mysticism, which draws on that of Turkish and Persian poets, rejects the pessimistic escapism of the spirit, similar to Baudelaire on whom Ćatić likewise draws.

Impact
Ćatić began in the style of his predecessor Safvet-beg Bašagić, standardized, with conventional instruments of versification and metrics, and a limited fund of metaphors from female folk songs and Eastern poetic symbols. But he soon made ground in the limited and underdeveloped poetic heritage surrounding him, spurring a small school of literary followers who would represent the second phase in the development of modern Bosnian poetry.

Works
Pjesme od godine 1900.-1908. (1914, compiled 1900-1908)
Izvorna poezija and Izvorna i prevedena proza (1962, as "Sabrana dijela")

References

External links
Musa Ćazim Ćatić
Biography and Works

1878 births
1915 deaths
Bosniaks of Bosnia and Herzegovina
Bosnia and Herzegovina Muslims
People from Odžak
Bosnia and Herzegovina writers
Bosniak writers
Bosniak poets
Bosnia and Herzegovina poets
Austro-Hungarian poets